Palaemonoidea is a large superfamily of shrimp, containing nearly 1,000 species. The position of the family Typhlocarididae is unclear, although the monophyly of a group containing the remaining seven families is well supported.
Anchistioididae Borradaile, 1915
Desmocarididae Borradaile, 1915
Euryrhynchidae Holthuis, 1950
Gnathophyllidae Dana, 1852
Hymenoceridae Ortmann, 1890
Kakaducarididae Bruce, 1993
Palaemonidae Rafinesque, 1815
Typhlocarididae Annandale & Kemp, 1913

See also
Palaemon modestus

References

 
Caridea
Taxa named by Constantine Samuel Rafinesque
Arthropod superfamilies